The following highways are numbered 813:

Costa Rica
 National Route 813

Hungary
 Main road 813 (Hungary)

United States